The 1991–92 Liverpool F.C. season was the 100th season in club history and Graeme Souness's first full season as manager of the club. The manager needed heart surgery in April, only to be present when Liverpool won the final of the FA Cup the following month. However, it was a disappointing season in the league for Liverpool, whose sixth-place finish was their first outside the top two since 1981.

Souness reshaped his side substantially over the close season. Out went older players including Peter Beardsley, David Speedie and Gary Gillespie as well as the young Steve Staunton, and in came £2.9million national record signing Dean Saunders from Derby County along with his Derby colleague, defender Mark Wright. He also forked out for Rangers midfielder Mark Walters and blooded in young talent in midfield in the shape of Steve McManaman and Jamie Redknapp, and just after the season began he drafted in Rob Jones from Fourth Division Crewe Alexandra, and within a few months the player, barely in his twenties, was representing England at senior level.

On his way out of Anfield halfway through the season was midfielder Steve McMahon to Manchester City, followed by defender Barry Venison to Newcastle United at the end of it. Mid season also saw the arrival of midfielder Michael Thomas from Arsenal, two and a half years after the player's goal for his former club had denied Liverpool the league title. Thomas ended the season by scoring one of Liverpool's two goals in the FA Cup final against Sunderland, the other coming from Ian Rush.

Season overview

Pre season
As manager Graeme Souness prepared for his first full season as manager of Liverpool, a number of significant changes were made. The biggest stories of the summer were the arrival of Dean Saunders, the Derby County and Wales striker, for a national record fee of £2.9million, and Derby's centre-half Mark Wright for £2.2million. He bolstered the midfield with a £1.25million move for Rangers midfielder Mark Walters, bringing the 27-year-old Birmingham born player back to England four years after he left Aston Villa to move north of the border. Leaving the club were strikers David Speedie to Blackburn Rovers and Peter Beardsley to Everton. A surprise sale came when highly promising 22-year-old defender Steve Staunton moved to Aston Villa 10 days before the start of the season.

August
Liverpool's centenary season began at Anfield on 17 August 1991, where they beat Oldham Athletic (in the top flight for the first time since 1923) 2–1 in the opening First Division game. The next game was a disappointment as they lost 2–1 to Manchester City at Maine Road, but highly rated 19-year-old midfielder Steve McManaman managed to score his first goal for the club in this game.

Record signing Dean Saunders found the net for the first time on 27 August, scoring the only goal of a 1–0 home win over Queen's Park Rangers, Saunders had also missed a penalty in the match at Manchester City.

The month ended on a high as the Reds triumphed 3–1 over Everton in the Merseyside derby at Anfield.

September
September saw Liverpool disappoint in the league, losing at Leeds United, drawing with Aston Villa and Sheffield Wednesday, and only managing a narrow win at newly promoted relegation favourites Notts County.

There was more success on the European front, as Liverpool marked the end of their six-year ban by defeating Kuusysi Lahti 6–1 in the UEFA Cup first round first leg at Anfield, with Dean Saunders scoring four goals and Ray Houghton scoring twice.

On 23 September, winger John Barnes, a key part in Liverpool's successes since his arrival in 1987, was told that he would be out of action until at least January due to an achilles tendon injury. Although he did make a brief return to the side in the new year, he was soon out of action again.

October
Graeme Souness pulled off one of the biggest transfer bargains of the season when he paid Crewe Alexandra £300,000 for full-back Rob Jones. Jones, who turned 20 a month after arriving at Anfield, broke into the Liverpool first team almost instantly, and was capped by England after just four months of First Division football.

Liverpool's disappointing league form continued throughout October as they were held to draws by Manchester United and Chelsea and could only scrape a 1–0 win over struggling Coventry City, though there was better news in the cup competitions as they progressed to the next stage of the UEFA Cup and the League Cup, though they were held to a draw by Second Division strugglers Port Vale in the League Cup third round, and were left with an uphill struggle in the UEFA Cup after losing 2–0 to Auxerre of France in the second round first leg.

November
November began on a high note as Liverpool overturned Auxerre's 2–0 lead in the UEFA Cup to win the second leg 3–0. Their hopes of a quarter-final appearance were boosted at the end of the month when they won the third round first leg 2–0 win over Swarovski Tirol in Austria. The Reds also overcame Port Vale in the League Cup by winning the replay 4–1 at Vale Park.

However, there was little improvement in the league as a defeat by Crystal Palace and goalless draws at West Ham United and Wimbledon - both struggling at the wrong end of the First Division - left a league title win looking unlikely for this season. Their only league win of the month came when they beat Norwich City 2–1 at Anfield.

December
December began on a humiliating note for the Reds as they suffered a shock League Cup exit at the hands of Peterborough United in the fourth round, losing 1–0 to the Third Division underdogs at London Road.

They did, however, progress to the last eight of the UEFA Cup, beating Swarovski Tirol 4–0 in the third round second leg at Anfield with Dean Saunders scoring a hat-trick, taking his European tally to nine goals.

December brought little change in Liverpool's league fortunes, however. They went through the month unbeaten in the First Division, managing wins over Nottingham Forest and Tottenham Hotspur but being held to draws by Southampton (in a game where 18-year-old midfielder Jamie Redknapp scored his first Liverpool goal), Manchester City, QPR and last of all Everton in the Merseyside derby at Goodison Park. They ended 1991 in sixth place, with their great north western rivals Manchester United top of the pack with a two-point advantage and two games in hand over a resurgent Leeds United.

January
As the new year dawned, Liverpool began an upturn in league fortunes as they won all four of their games. There was also good news in the FA Cup as they travelled to Gresty Road to take on Fourth Division Crewe Alexandra, winning 4-0 and with John Barnes making an explosive - though ultimately brief - comeback from his absence by scoring a hat-trick.

Liverpool ended the month in third place, just eight points behind leaders Manchester United and six points behind second placed Leeds United, suggesting that they might still be able to win the title.

February
Liverpool managed to reach the FA Cup quarter-finals, but not without difficulty. The fourth round visit to Second Division underdogs Bristol Rovers saw them held to a 1–1 draw, and the replay at Anfield brought a narrow 2–1 win. The fifth round saw them travel to Suffolk for a clash with Ipswich Town - Second Division promotion contenders - which ended in a goalless draw. Once again, Liverpool won the Anfield replay, but it was also a narrow victory as they needed extra time to manage a 3–2 win as the score stood at 1–1 with 90 minutes on the clock.

After an excellent series of league results in January had raised hopes of a late run to the title, February was a disaster which effectively killed off talk of Liverpool winning the last old First Division title - as the top flight of English football would become the FA Premier League from the start of the 1992-93 season. The month began with a 2–1 home defeat by Chelsea, followed by a goalless draw at relegation threatened Coventry City and a 3-0 hammering at fellow strugglers Norwich City. The month ended with another struggling side, Southampton, paying a visit to Anfield, but neither side could find the net and the match ended as a goalless draw. The Reds ended the month fifth in the league, but were now 13 points adrift of leaders Manchester United with 12 games to go. It was now looking as though Liverpool would finish outside the top two for the first time since 1981, as 11 points separated them from second placed Leeds United.

March
A 4-1 aggregate defeat by Genoa of Italy in the UEFA Cup quarter-finals ended Liverpool's hopes of a glorious return to European football, but their last hope of silverware was kept alive when recently signed midfielder Michael Thomas - whose last minute goal against them for former club Arsenal had deprived them of title glory in 1989 - scored the only goal for a quarter-final win over Aston Villa in the FA Cup.

Liverpool's league form improved as they managed wins over West Ham United, Notts County and Tottenham Hotspur, but were defeated by Crystal Palace and Sheffield United, ensuring that they ended the month no higher than fourth in the league. The title was still a mathematical possibility as they trailed leaders Manchester United by 12 points with seven games remaining at the end of the month, but it now appeared a practical impossibility and Liverpool's efforts were now better focused on FA Cup success.

April
It had been a long and hard route for Liverpool in the FA Cup, but they finally did get to the FA Cup final. The semi-final draw paired them with Second Division Portsmouth, and the game was still deadlock with 90 minutes on the clock. The Hampshire side went ahead in extra time, and only a late equaliser by Ronnie Whelan prevented a defeat which would have sent Portsmouth through to the first non top division final to take on fellow Second Division side Sunderland.

Hours after the game, Liverpool manager Graeme Souness was rushed to hospital for an emergency triple heart bypass operation. He was still recovering in hospital eight days later when coach Ronnie Moran took charge of Liverpool for the FA Cup semi final replay, in which Portsmouth held the Reds to a goalless draw to force a penalty shoot-out which the Reds won.

By April, everyone at Liverpool appeared to have conceded the league title for this season, and focused their minds on winning the FA Cup. After a five-match winless run in the league, the month ended with a 2–0 home win over Manchester United - a result which handed the title to Leeds United.

May
On 9 May 1992, Liverpool travelled to Wembley Stadium for the FA Cup final. Their opponents were Sunderland, the unfashionable Second Division side who had been unremarkable in the league but performed wonders in the FA Cup under interim manager Malcolm Crosby. There were hopes among Sunderland fans that they could achieve a repeat of their famous 1973 win over Leeds United and achieve a shock victory, but these were dispelled as goals from Ian Rush and Michael Thomas gave the Reds a 2–0 victory and their fifth FA Cup triumph.

Squad

First Division

Table

Matches

FA Cup

Football League Cup

UEFA Cup

Statistics

Top scorers

References

Liverpool F.C. seasons
Liverpool